List of all the members of the Storting in the period 1931 to 1933. The list includes all those initially elected to the Storting as well as deputy representatives where available.

Rural constituencies

Østfold county

Akershus county

Oslo

Hedmark county

Oppland county

Buskerud county

Vestfold county

Telemark county

Aust-Agder county

Vest-Agder county

Rogaland county

Hordaland county

Sogn og Fjordane county

Møre county

Sør-Trøndelag county

Nord-Trøndelag county

Nordland county

Troms county

Finnmark county

Urban constituencies

Halden, Sarpsborg, Fredrikstad, Moss, Drøbak

Hamar, Kongsvinger, Lillehammer, Gjøvik

Hønefoss, Drammen, Kongsberg

Notodden, Skien, Porsgrunn, Brevik, Kragerø, Risør, Arendal, Grimstad

Holmestrand, Horten, Tønsberg, Sandefjord, Larvik

Kristiansand, Mandal, Flekkefjord, Stavanger, Haugesund

Bergen

Ålesund, Molde, Kristiansund

Trondheim, Levanger

Bodø, Narvik, Tromsø, Hammerfest, Vardø, Vadsø

External links
Norsk samfunnsvitenskapelig datatjeneste Norwegian social science data service

 
Parliament of Norway, 1931-33